The Aror University of Art, Architecture, Design and Heritage (اروڑ يونيوؤسٹى آف آرٹ، آركيٹكچر، ڈيزائن اينڈ هيريٹج) established  near Sukkur at Rohri bypass N-5 National Highway in the vicinity of ancient historical town of Aror, once the capital of Sindh. The university will offer the graduate, postgraduate an advance studies in the field of architecture, textile design, civil engineering, media sciences, archeology, photography, interior design, communication design, ceramics and other disciplines. The university was established by the government of Sindh through the act of parliament on Monday 15 June 2020 through the Government Bill passed by the Sindh Assembly. First it was established as Sindh College of Arts & Design, under the Quaid-e-Awam University of Engineering, Science & Technology. In April 2018, the Bill of Aror University of Art, Architecture, Design and Heritage was moved as private members bill by Member Parliament Syed Awais Qadir Shah of PPP to upgrade the college to full-fledged University. That bill was passed by the Sindh Assembly and was sent to the Governor of Sindh. The Sindh governor returned the bill with the observation to ensure participation of HEC. The university & Boards Department in the light of the observations of Governor prepared the draft and on the instructions of the chief minister placed it before the cabinet. The cabinet approved it and sent the bill to the Sindh Assembly. The Provincial Assembly of Sindh in its sitting held on Thursday, 2 May 2019 referred the Bill, to the Standing Committee on Higher, Technical Education and Research with the terms of reference to examine the bill and report back to the Assembly.  After getting report of the Standing Committee, finally The Aror University of Art, Architecture, Design and Heritage, Sukkur, Bill, 2019 was passed  along with seven other bills when the Sindh Assembly unanimously passed eight government bills on Monday 15 June 2020, The bill was assented to by the honorable Governor of Sindh on 7 July 2020 and was published as Provincial Assembly of Sindh Notification No. PAS/LEGIS.B -11/2019, Dated: 15 July 2020 in the Sindh Government Gazette as SINDH ACT NO. IX OF 2020.

Faculties
The university shall include the following Faculties. 
 (i) Faculty of Textile Designing
 (ii) Civil Engineering
 (iii) Faculty of Architecture
 (iv) Faculty of Archeology
 (v) Faculty of Fine Art
 (vi) Faculty of Performing Art
 (vii) Faculty of Heritages
 (viii) Faculty of Media Sciences
 (ix) Faculty of Photography
 (x) Such other faculties of Allied Art, Architectural Design and heritages as may be prescribed by the statutes

Admissions
The HEC give accreditation to Aror University Sukkur and allow to admit students
 
 Bachelor’s in Architecture (B.Arch) 
 BS Civil Engineering
 BS Environmental Science
 BS Visual Arts
 BS Fashion Design
 BS Textile Design
 BS History  
 BS Archaeology

See also
 List of educational institutions in Sukkur
 Sukkur
 Begum Nusrat Bhutto Women University

References

Public universities and colleges in Sindh